Littleton Purnell Franklin (January 18, 1831- April 9, 1888) was an American politician.

Franklin, the son of Henry and Mary (Purnell) Franklin, was born on January 18, 1831, in Berlin, Maryland, where he spent nearly the whole of his useful life. He entered Yale College in the third term of the Freshman year.  After graduation in 1849, he read law in Snow Hill, Md., with the late Judge John R. Franklin, and in May, 1852, he was admitted to the bar.  Being in delicate health throughout all this portion of his life, he never entered on the practice of his profession, but employed his time principally in farming near Berlin. In 1867 he represented Worcester County in the convention which framed the present Constitution of Maryland. He was elected in 1871 to the Maryland House of Delegates from this county, on the Democratic ticket, and in 1877 to the Maryland State Senate, where he served in the sessions of 1878 and 1880. He was for years an elder in the Presbyterian Church of Berlin. He died at his home near Berlin, of typhoid fever, after an illness of two weeks, on April 9, 1888, in his 58th year.

He married, February 9, 1853, Sarah E., daughter of Thomas Chaney, Esq., of Issaquena County, Mississippi, who survived him with four of their seven children,—two daughters and two sons.

External links

1831 births
1888 deaths
People from Berlin, Maryland
Yale College alumni
Members of the Maryland House of Delegates
Maryland state senators
19th-century American politicians